The Murchison meteorite is a meteorite that fell in Australia in 1969 near Murchison, Victoria. It belongs to  the carbonaceous chondrite class, a group of meteorites rich in organic compounds. Due to its mass (over ) and the fact that it was an observed fall, the Murchison meteorite is one of the most studied of all meteorites.

In January 2020, cosmochemists reported that the oldest material found on Earth to date are the silicon carbide particles from the Murchison meteorite, which have been determined to be 7 billion years old, about 2.5 billion years older than the 4.54-billion-year age of the Earth and the Solar System. The published study noted that "dust lifetime estimates mainly rely on sophisticated theoretical models. These models, however, focus on the more common small dust grains and are based on assumptions with large uncertainties."

History
On 28 September 1969 at approximately 10:58 a.m. local time, near Murchison, Victoria, in Australia, a bright fireball was observed to separate into three fragments before disappearing, leaving a cloud of smoke. About 30 seconds later, a tremor was heard. The total collected mass of the meteorite exceeds .

Classification and composition
The meteorite belongs to the CM group of carbonaceous chondrites. Like most CM chondrites, Murchison is petrologic type 2, which means that it experienced extensive alteration by water-rich fluids on its parent body before falling to Earth. CM chondrites, together with the CI group, are rich in carbon and are among the most chemically primitive meteorites. Like other CM chondrites, Murchison contains abundant calcium-aluminium-rich inclusions. More than 15 amino acids, some of the basic components of life, have been identified during multiple studies of this meteorite.

In January 2020, astronomers reported that Murchison meteorite silicon carbide particles had been determined to be 7 billion years old, 2.5 billion years older than the 4.54 billion years age of the Earth and the Solar System, and the oldest material found on Earth to date.

Organic compounds

Murchison contains common amino acids such as glycine, alanine, and glutamic acid as well as unusual ones such as isovaline and pseudoleucine. A complex mixture of alkanes was isolated as well, similar to that found in the Miller–Urey experiment. Serine and threonine, usually considered to be earthly contaminants, were conspicuously absent in the samples. A specific family of amino acids called diamino acids was identified in the Murchison meteorite as well.

The initial report stated that the amino acids were racemic and therefore formed in an abiotic manner, because amino acids of terrestrial proteins are all of the L-configuration of chirality. Later the amino acid alanine, which is also a protein amino acid, was found to have an excess of the L-configuration, which led several scientists to suspect terrestrial contamination according to the argument that it would be "unusual for an abiotic stereoselective decomposition or synthesis of amino acids to occur with protein amino acids but not with non-protein amino acids". In 1997, L-excesses also were found in a non-protein amino acid, isovaline, suggesting an extraterrestrial source for molecular asymmetry in the Solar System. At the same time, L-excesses of alanine were found in Murchison, but with enrichment in the isotope 15N, however, the isotopic pairing was contested later, on analytical grounds. By 2001, the list of organic materials identified in the meteorite was extended to polyols.

The meteorite contained a mixture of left-handed and right-handed amino acids; most amino acids used by living organisms are left-handed in chirality, and most sugars used are right-handed. A team of chemists in Sweden demonstrated in 2005 that this homochirality could have been triggered or catalyzed, by the action of a left-handed amino acid such as proline.

Several lines of evidence indicate that the interior portions of well-preserved fragments from Murchison are pristine. A 2010 study using high resolution analytical tools including spectroscopy, identified 14,000 molecular compounds, including 70 amino acids, in a sample of the meteorite. The limited scope of the analysis by mass spectrometry provides for a potential 50,000 or more unique molecular compositions, with the team estimating the possibility of millions of distinct organic compounds in the meteorite.

Nucleobases

Measured purine and pyrimidine compounds were found in the Murchison meteorite. Carbon isotope ratios for uracil and xanthine of δ13C = +44.5‰ and +37.7‰, respectively, indicate a non-terrestrial origin for these compounds. This specimen demonstrates that many organic compounds could have been delivered by early Solar System bodies and may have played a key role in life's origin.

See also
 Cosmochemistry
 Glossary of meteoritics
 Panspermia

Notes

References

External links

 
 

Meteorites found in Australia
Geology of Victoria (Australia)
1969 in Australia
1969 in science
Modern Earth impact events
September 1969 events in Australia
1960s in Victoria (Australia)